Gerald Reynolds may refer to:

Gerald A. Reynolds (born 1964), American politician and lawyer
Gerry Reynolds (British politician) (1927–1969), former British Member of Parliament for Islington North

See also 
Gerry Reynolds (disambiguation)
Jerry Reynolds (disambiguation)